Dana Zimmerman is a paralympic athlete from the United States competing mainly in category T37 distance events.

Dana competed in the 800m, 1500m and 5000m at the 1996 Summer Paralympics in his home country.  He also competed in the 2000 Summer Paralympics in the 5000m and won a silver medal in the 1500m.

References

External links
 
 Dana Zimmerman - PE Central
 ADA celebration features Paralympian Zimmerman

Paralympic track and field athletes of the United States
Athletes (track and field) at the 1996 Summer Paralympics
Athletes (track and field) at the 2000 Summer Paralympics
Paralympic silver medalists for the United States
Living people
Medalists at the 2000 Summer Paralympics
Year of birth missing (living people)
Paralympic medalists in athletics (track and field)
American male middle-distance runners